Caïssa ([ka:isa]) is a fictional (anachronistic) Thracian dryad portrayed as the goddess of chess. She was first mentioned during the Renaissance by Italian poet Hieronymus Vida.

Vida's poem
Caïssa originated in a 658-line poem called Scacchia Ludus published in 1527 by Hieronymus Vida (Marco Girolamo Vida), which describes in Latin Virgilian hexameters a chess game between Apollo and Mercury in the presence of the other gods. In it, to avoid unclassical words such as rochus (chess rook) or alfinus (chess bishop), the rooks are described as towers (armored howdahs) on elephants' backs, and the bishops as archers:

A leaked unauthorized 742-line draft version was published in 1525. Its text is very different, and in it Caïssa is called Scacchia, the chess rook is a cyclops, and the chess bishop is a centaur archer.

The description of towers led to the modern name "castle" for the chess rook, and thus the term "castling", and the modern shape of the European rook chesspiece. Also for a time, some chess players in Europe called the rook "elephant" and the bishop "archer". In German, Schütze ("archer") became a general word for a chess bishop until displaced by Läufer ("runner") in the 18th century.

William Jones's poem 
The young English orientalist William Jones re-used the idea of a chess poem in 1763, in his own poem Caïssa or The Game at Chess written in English heroic couplets. In his poem, Caïssa initially repels the advances of the god of war, Mars. Spurned, Mars seeks the aid of Euphron, God of Sport (Jones's invention), brother of Venus, who creates the game of chess as a gift for Mars to win Caïssa's favor.

It is an unproven assumption that Jones's name "Caïssa" (ka-is-sa) is an equivalent to Vida's name "Scacchia" (ska-ki-a).

The English version of Philidor's 1777 Systematic introduction to the game and the analysis of chess contained Jones's poem. In 1851 the poem was translated into French by Camille Théodore Frédéric Alliey.

Victoria Winifred's novel 
Children's author Victoria Winifred picked up on the story begun in William Jones's poem in her 2022 mythological fantasy, "The Princess, the Knight, and the Lost God: A Chess Story". In this continuation, Mars and Caïssa were wed after the events told in Jones's rendition. Caïssa then received her immortality and goddesship from Mars, and they reigned together over the kingdom of Chess Mountain. Later, their 12-year-old daughter, Princess Kassie, goes on to establish her own goddess title in the chess realm through a series of adventures and a mission completed on Earth.

Modern use
Caïssa is referred to in chess commentary.
 Garry Kasparov uses this reference now and again, especially in his five-volume work My Great Predecessors. He cites her as a metaphor for good luck – "Caïssa was with me" – especially in unclear situations, for example in sacrifices.
 The 1994 book The March of Chess Ideas by Anthony Saidy extensively uses Caïssa as well.
 T. R. Dawson extensively used Caïssa, both as a character to provide literary narrative to accompany his problem collections, and merely as a convenient personification of chess.
 The chess variant Caïssa Britannia, created by Fergus Duniho, was named after Caïssa.
 When writing about chess, Heinrich Fraenkel used the pseudonym "Assiac", which is "Caïssa" spelled backwards.
 Antonio Radić, a Croatian YouTuber who runs the channel 'agadmator's Chess Channel', has created a chess-based manga named "Age of Caissa", depicting a post-apocalyptic world ruled by artificial intelligence.

Caïssa as a concept has also been explored by some who seek the evidence of the sacred feminine in chess.

The computer program that won the first World Computer Chess Championship (in 1974) was named Kaissa.

The card game Android: Netrunner features a program type named Caïssa, which are modeled after chess pieces.

References

Bibliography

External links
 Text of Scacchia, Ludus, by Hieronymus Vida of Cremona (1559)
 Caïssa by William Jones 1763 edochess.ca/batgirl/
 Caissa's Web a selection of chess poems at members.caissa.com

History of chess
Chess in the United Kingdom
Dryads
Nymphs
Poems about chess